The Eden Valley Railway (EVR) was a railway in Cumbria, England. It ran between Clifton Junction near Penrith and Kirkby Stephen via Appleby-in-Westmorland.

Passenger traffic ended in 1962 and the line was reduced to the track between the junction at Appleby station with the Settle-Carlisle Line and Kirkby Stephen which served a quarry. It was used by infrequent British Army services to Warcop Training Area until 1989.

In 1995 the Eden Valley Railway Society was formed with the aim of reinstating services and restoring on the line. Heritage railway services resumed in 2006 between Warcop and Sandford, with an extension of  being opened in 2013, giving a current running line of almost .

History

Background
Prior to the construction of the Eden Valley Railway, in the 1840s, several schemes had been proposed which would have run to the Eden Valley; one was the York & Carlisle Junction Railway, backed by the Great North of England Railway, which would have run from Northallerton to Barnard Castle then across the Pennines to Kirkby Stephen, after which two branches would have been formed to connect with the Lancaster and Carlisle Railway; one to Tebay and the other to Clifton. Another similar scheme was the Northumberland & Lancashire Union which would have run from Gateshead near Newcastle upon Tyne to Barnard Castle, and then as the York & Carlisle line across the Pennines via Kirkby Stephen to Tebay. Additionally the  Yorkshire and Glasgow Union Railway was planned to run west from Thirsk through Wensleydale to Hawes, then north through the Mallerstang Valley to Kirkby Stephen, and then through the Eden Valley to Clifton via Appleby-in-Westmorland. Both the Yorkshire & Glasgow Union and part of the York & Carlisle Junction to Tebay were empowered by acts of Parliament in 1845 but the end of the Railway bubble of the 1840s meant that they were not built.

It was not until the late 1850s that a line through the Eden Valley was proposed again. Firstly a new trans-Pennine railway line was proposed, reviving the earlier schemes; the South Durham and Lancashire Union Railway (SD&LUR) was to run from the Stockton and Darlington Railway to Kirkby Stephen and then to Tebay. A second line, the Eden Valley Railway would branch from the first at Kirkby Stephen and then go to Clifton via the upper Eden Valley. The main purpose of these lines was freight, not passengers; bringing higher grade iron ore from Cumberland and Lancashire to the blast furnaces of the North East, and coal and coke from the mines of Durham to the northwest of England. The route was shorter than the alternative, the Lancaster and Carlisle Railway.

The act of Parliament authorising South Durham and Lancashire Union Railway was passed on 13 July 1857, and that for the Eden Valley Railway came soon after on 21 May 1858.

The act allowed the raising a capital of £180,000, the appointed directors of the company include important figures from Westmorland and Cumberland including William Brougham,  Sir Richard Tufton Isaac Wilson as well as Henry Pease.

Construction and route
Construction of the  line was contracted to Messrs. Lawton Brothers of Newcastle, the turning of the sod ceremony took place on 4 August 1858 with Lord Brougham. Most of the stone for the railway's stations was quarried near Cliburn. Construction of the line was straightforward with only three minor rivers to cross and no tunnels in low-lying land; the maximum incline was 1 in 80, the average 1 in 150. The cost of construction had been £204,803 0s 8d.

From Kirkby Stephen East station on the SD&LUR the line to Cumbria  curves northwest to the junction at which the Eden Valley railway separates from the Tebay line and begins to travel roughly north.  after the junction a bridge over Scandal Beck is reached which was crossed by an iron bridge, less than  further north the River Eden was crossed by Musgrave viaduct of three  lattice girder iron spans.

Next was the minor Musgrave station to the west of the village of Great Musgrave. The line then curved to the northwest towards Warcop and after  reached Warcop station. From Warcop the line continued northwest along the Eden valley north of the Eden crossing Coupland Beck after  by a viaduct, and then continued to Appleby about  after Warcop station.

The line then continued west, and curved south on a chord connecting it to a north facing junction near Clifton, Cumbria connecting the line to Clifton and Lowther station on the Lancaster & Carlisle Railway.

The line was built as a single track line and was worked by the Stockton and Darlington Railway from its inception, it opened for mineral trains on 8 April 1862, and for passengers on 9 June the same year.

1862 to 1923: NER

Soon after opening the amalgamation of the railway into the Stockton and Darlington Railway along with the South Durham and Lancashire Union Railway and Frosterley and Stanhope Railway was sanctioned by an Act of Parliament on 30 June 1862. The following year the Stockton and Darlington merged into the North Eastern Railway, and the Eden Valley line too became part of that larger system.

During the construction of the railway, in 1861, an act of Parliament was passed that would increase the importance of the Eden Valley Line. This was the act permitting the construction of the Cockermouth, Keswick and Penrith Railway, which by 1865 had been opened. It connected to the Cockermouth and Workington Railway, and hence the ports and industrialised iron-rich regions of the west Cumbrian coast (Workington, Whitehaven) were linked to the Lancaster and Carlisle line (operated by the London and North Western Railway) near Penrith close to the Eden Valley's own junction. This made the Eden Valley line a route of choice for transport of materials between the north east and north west of England. Permission to build a connection allowing trains from the north to run directly onto the Eden Valley line was obtained in 1862, and the new section opened in 1863, along with a new station for Clifton (renamed Clifton Moor in 1927) on the chord. Eden Valley passenger trains now ran via this northern track, and had running powers on the L&CR line, now going to Penrith. After 1874 the southern chord was abandoned.

During the 1870s the Settle and Carlisle Railway was being constructed, which also ran through the upper Eden Valley. West of the station in Appleby in Westmorland a junction with the Eden Valley railway was built allowing trains travelling north to cross onto the westbound Eden Valley line. Further west the Settle line crossed over the Eden Valley line.

1923 to 1948: LNER

Between 1923 and 1948 the line was part of the London and North Eastern Railway.

1948 to 1989: British Railways

In 1948 the railways of Britain were nationalised and the line became part of British Railways. In the following decade several stations closed: Musgrave station in 1952, Kirkby Thore in 1953, Temple Sowerby closed to passengers in 1953, and Cliburn station in 1956.

In 1958 a two car diesel multiple unit service was introduced. However between 1962 and 1963 the entire line closed to passengers. At the same time the Stainmore railway also closed completely apart from a short section of track eastwards from Kirkby Stephen East railway station to Merrygill Viaduct for the quarry nearby. From then on only freight trains used the line.

The line from Clifton to Appleby was also closed, and, from 1963 points east of Appleby could only be reached via the junction with the Settle and Carlisle railway at Appleby. Freight trains still ran from Appleby to Kirkby Stephen and then to Hartley Quarry. Trains for the Warcop Training Area north of Warcop village ran until 1989.

The line today
The section of line between Appleby and Warcop has been restored by the Eden Valley Railway Trust, originally known as the Eden Valley Railway Society. At the southern end of the route, the Stainmore Railway Company has reinstated a short stretch of track near Kirkby Stephen East station.

Other than in the restored sections, none of the track remains in situ. Most of the trackbed remains as a feature on the landscape and as field boundaries. To the south east of Kirkby Thore the A66 road crosses the trackbed close to where Kirkby Thore station once stood, and the station was demolished when the road was remodelled in 1974. Clifton Moor, Cliburn, Temple Sowerby and Warcop and Musgrave railway stations are now private residences. Other features including the signal boxes at Cliburn and Warcop have survived. The bridges at Musgrave and Skygarth have been removed. The former junction west of Kirkby Stephen with the line to Tebay is now a nature reserve.

Notes

References

Sources
A Regional History of the Railways of Great Britain, Volume 4: The North East, K. Hoole, 3rd Edition, 1986
The North Eastern Railway, Cecil J. Allen, 1974
The North Eastern Railway; its rise and development, William Weaver Tomlinson, 1915, online version via www.archive.org
The Eden Valley Railway, Alan Dick, 1992, article, images track diagrams, via www.cumbria-railways.co.uk
Cumbria Railways - The Eden Valley Railway, description, images and maps, www.cumbria-railways.co.uk

Map coordinates and images

Closed railway lines in North West England
Railway companies established in 1858
Railway lines opened in 1862
Railway companies disestablished in 1862
1858 establishments in England
British companies established in 1858